Dêlêg is a village in Xaitongmoin county (Tibetan: ་)  of Shigatse Prefecture in the Tibet Autonomous Region of China, northeast of the county seat. The Tibetan name means "good luck". It lies at an elevation of 4,804 metres (15,764 feet). In 2007 the village had a population of about 350.

The main source of income in the area is herding yaks and sheep, major crops are Tibetan barley (qingko), buckwheat, peas and rapeseed.

See also 

 List of towns and villages in Tibet

Footnotes 

 

Populated places in Tibet